Three crows is a term used by stock market analysts to describe a market downturn.  It appears on a candlestick chart in the financial markets. It unfolds across three trading sessions, and consists of three long candlesticks that trend downward like a staircase. Each candle should open below the previous day's open, ideally in the middle price range of that previous day. Each candlestick should also close progressively downward to establish a new near-term low. The pattern indicates a strong price reversal from a bull market to a bear market.
 
The three crows help to confirm that a bull market has ended and market sentiment has turned negative. In Japanese Candlestick Charting Techniques, technical analyst Steve Nison says "The three crows would likely be useful for longer-term traders."

This candlestick pattern has a counterpart known as the Three white soldiers, whose attributes help identify a bullish reversal or market upswing.

See also
Candlestick chart
Technical analysis
Market timing

References

Japanese Candlestick Charting Techniques by Steve Nison. Published by New York Institute of Finance. 
Candlestick Charting Explained by Gregory L. Morris. Published by McGraw-Hill.

External links
Stock Charts - Glossary
Investopedia - Dictionary

Candlestick patterns

fr:Analyse technique
id:Analisis teknikal
nl:Technische analyse